Louis-James Alfred Lefébure-Wély (13 November 1817 – 31 December 1869) was a French organist and composer. He played a major role in the development of the French symphonic organ style and was closely associated with the organ builder Aristide Cavaillé-Coll, inaugurating many new Cavaillé-Coll organs.

His playing was virtuosic, and as a performer, he was rated above eminent contemporaries including César Franck. His compositions, less substantial than those of Franck and others, have not held such a prominent place in the repertory.

Biography
Lefébure-Wély was born in Paris, son of an organist.  He studied with his father, Isaac-François-Antoine Lefebvre (1756–1831), who had changed his name to Antoine Lefébure-Wely after being appointed organist of the fashionable church of Saint-Roch in the 1st arrondissement. The boy was musically precocious. In the manuscript of an unpublished Mass by his father is a note:

Within two years of that occasion, Antoine Lefébure-Wely suffered a stroke, paralysing his left side. For the next five years, his son deputised for him. When  Alfred was fourteen Antoine died, and the son succeeded the father as official organist of Saint-Roch. While holding the post he entered the Paris Conservatoire in 1832, studying with François Benoist. In 1835 he won first prize for organ. Following that he studied composition with Berton and Halévy. In 1838 he began a long association with the organ-builder Aristide Cavaillé-Coll, performing to a huge audience on the new instrument at Notre-Dame-de-Lorette. A reviewer in La France musical praised Lefébure-Wely's technical skill, but advised him to play music of a more serious style than he had developed. Lefébure-Wely, however, knew what the public wanted, and continued to perform music of a popular operatic type. When a new Cavaillé-Coll organ was installed at Saint-Roch in 1842 Lefébure-Wely incurred critical disapproval for playing a fantasia on themes from Meyerbeer's popular opera Robert le diable. He is an author of the manual for harmonium playing technique. He was the one who introduced the harmonium to Marc Burty.

A French government website about Cavaillé-Coll calls Lefébure-Wely an "exceptionally talented dandy who, better than anyone, had grasped the musical potential of the new tones and combinations to create music that was thrilling, renewing, impressive and at times heartrending".  The site says of the composer, "A protégé of the aristocracy, he frequented the bourgeois salons where he often performed with his wife, a singer … and his two daughters who were pianists. He was the incarnation of the organ of the Second Empire." Even Gioacchino Rossini, not known for the solemnity of most of his own music, once told Lefébure-Wely, "You are admired more for your faults than your virtues."

In 1847 Lefébure-Wely moved to the Église de la Madeleine, exchanging posts with the previous organist, Charles-Alexandre Fessy. In 1849 he was in charge of the music for the funeral of Frédéric Chopin, when he transcribed some of Chopin's piano works for the organ, attracting critical praise.

Lefébure-Wely was awarded the Légion d'honneur in 1850. His contemporary, César Franck became better known as a composer, but was not as highly regarded as an organist. Adolphe Adam commented, "Lefébure-Wely is the most skilful artist I know"; Camille Saint-Saëns,  Lefébure-Wely's successor at the Madeleine, observed, "Lefébure-Wely was a wonderful improviser … but he left only a few unimportant compositions for the organ." He was the dedicatee of the "12 études pour les pieds seulement" (12 Studies for organ pedals alone) by Charles-Valentin Alkan and of the "Final en si bémol" for organ, op. 21, by Franck.

Lefébure-Wely resigned his post at the Madeleine in 1858 to devote himself to composing a three-act opéra comique, Les recruteurs. It was premiered at the Opéra-Comique on December 11, 1861, but was not a great success. From 1863 until his death he was organist at  Saint-Sulpice, where the Cavaillé-Coll instrument was the largest in France. He died in Paris at the age of 52. Many musicians and other leading figures attended his Requiem Mass.  Ambroise Thomas gave the eulogy, in which he said, "Lefébure-Wely has taken his place among the most eminent organists – not only of his time, but of all periods and of all schools!" Lefébure-Wely was buried in Père Lachaise Cemetery; his tomb was designed by the architect Victor Baltard.

Compositions

Lefébure-Wely's first published composition was announced in the weekly journal Bibliographie de la France in their issue of 27 August 1831 so: Rondo composé pour le piano-forte par Alfred-Lefebure Wely, âgé de 13 ans, œuv. 1. (It was published by/available from both Lemoine and the composer's family, according to the next line.)

Among 200 compositions Lefébure-Wely wrote works for choir, piano, chamber ensemble, symphony orchestra and an opéra comique, Les recruteurs (1861, libretto by Amédée de Jallais and Alphonse Vulpian, 1795?-1829)). In the Grove Dictionary of Music and Musicians, David Sanger writes, "His organ pieces, many of which have recently become available in modern editions, include pastorales, versets, élevations and communions, which were sentimental, lyrical works, and offertories, marches and sorties, which were louder and more akin to the operetta choruses then in vogue."

The French government website says of Lefébure-Wely's music,  "His admirers called on him many times to adopt the 'religious style' …. However, he had his habits and his preferences, and, above all his 'clientele'. Also, even though his contemporaries were unanimous in their admiration for his improvisations, he often seems to have taken the easier alternative, the immediately accessible option, music that doesn't ask any questions."

Lefébure-Wely's compositions include:
Boléro de concert, op. 166. Régnier-Canaux, s.d. (1865)
Meditaciones religiosas op. 122. À sa majesté la reine Doña Isabel II. (1858)
Les Cloches du Monastère, op. 54. Hofmeister's Monatsbericht (1853 or earlier)
L’Office catholique. 120 Morceaux divisés en dix suites composés pour l'harmonium ou l'orgue à tuyaux, op. 148. Hommage à Monseigneur de la Bouillerie, Évêque de Carcassonne. Régnier-Canaux, s.d. (1861)
L’organiste moderne. Collection de morceaux d'orgue dans tous les genres. En 12 livraisons. Hommage à Mr. l'Abbé Hamon, Curé de St. Sulpice. Ces Morceaux ont été écrits sur les Motifs improvisés aux Offices de St. Sulpice. (1867–69)
Six offertoires op. 34. (ca. 1857)
Six grands offertoires op. 35. (ca. 1857)
Six morceaux pour l'orgue, contenant 3 marches et 3 élévations op. 36. Graff (1863)
Six grands offertoires, composé pour son fils
Vade-mecum de l'Organiste, op. 187. Entrées et Sorties de Chœur, Versets, Préludes pour Amen, Élévations et Communions, Offertoires, Marches brillantes pour Processions composés pour l'harmonium ou l'orgue à tuyaux (1869)

Selected recordings
 Vincent Genvrin, La Lyre Séraphique: Cantique et Pièces d'orgue, Motet à la Sainte Vierge (Éditions Hortus, HORT004).

Notes

References

External links
Sortie in E flat major (mp3)
Bolero de Concert in g minor (mp3)
 Louis J. A. Lefébure-Wely. Andante: choeur de voix humaines (1858). Andrew Pink (2022) Exordia ad missam.

Free Scores

e-Partitions Many newly edited and typeset organ scores.

1817 births
1869 deaths
19th-century classical composers
19th-century French composers
19th-century French male musicians
Composers for pipe organ
French Romantic composers
French male classical composers
French classical organists
French male organists
Musicians from Paris
Burials at Père Lachaise Cemetery
Male classical organists
19th-century organists